Hoplocryptanthus glaziovii is a species of flowering plant in the family Bromeliaceae, endemic to Brazil (the state of Minas Gerais). It was first described by Carl Christian Mez in 1891 as Cryptanthus glaziovii. It is found in the Brazilian Atlantic Forest ecoregion.

References

Bromelioideae
Flora of Brazil
Plants described in 1891